
Gmina Sidra is a rural gmina (administrative district) in Sokółka County, Podlaskie Voivodeship, in north-eastern Poland.

Villages
Gmina Sidra contains the villages and settlements of Andrzejewo, Bieniasze, Bierniki, Bierwicha, Chwaszczewo, Dworzysk, Gudebsk, Holiki, Jacowlany, Jakowla, Jałówka, Jałówka-Kolonia, Jurasze, Kalinówka, Kalwińszczyna, Klatka, Kniaziówka, Krzysztoforowo, Kurnatowszczyzna, Ludomirowo, Majewo, Majewo Kościelne, Makowlany, Nowinka, Ogrodniki, Olchowniki, Podsutki, Poganica, Pohorany, Potrubowszczyzna, Putnowce, Racewo, Romanówka, Siderka, Sidra, Siekierka, Słomianka, Śniczany, Staworowo, Stefanowo, Szczerbowo, Szostaki, Wandzin, Władysławowo, Wólka, Zacisze, Zalesie, Zelwa and Zwierżany.

Neighbouring gminas
Gmina Sidra is bordered by the gminas of Dąbrowa Białostocka, Janów, Kuźnica, Nowy Dwór and Sokółka.

References
Polish official population figures 2006

Sidra
Sokółka County